The United Kingdom Cotton Industry Act 1959 aimed to reorganise the Lancashire cotton industry to prevent its further decline. It provided for grants to replace equipment. The reorganisation process was voluntary  in large part to be managed by the Cotton Board (United Kingdom).

It was the last major legislative intervention, following other attempts to help rationalise and modernise the industry including the Cotton Industry (Reorganisation) Act 1936 and 1939.

Implementation of the Act ran into considerable trouble as demand for cotton collapsed.

References

Cotton industry in England
1950s economic history
History of Lancashire
History of the textile industry in the United Kingdom
United Kingdom Acts of Parliament 1959